Randall Hank Williams (born May 26, 1949), known professionally as Hank Williams Jr. or Bocephus, is an American singer-songwriter and musician. His musical style is often considered a blend of southern rock, blues, and country. He is the son of country musician Hank Williams and the father of musicians Holly Williams and Hank Williams III. 

Williams began his career following in his famed father's footsteps, covering his father's songs and imitating his father's style. Williams' first television appearance was in a 1964 episode of ABC's The Jimmy Dean Show, in which at age fourteen he sang several songs associated with his father. Later that year, he was a guest star on Shindig!

Williams' style evolved slowly as he struggled to find his own voice and place within country music. This was interrupted by a near-fatal fall off the side of Ajax Peak in Montana on August 8, 1975. After an extended recovery, he challenged the country music establishment with a blend of country, rock and blues. As a multi-instrumentalist, Williams' repertoire of skills includes guitar, bass guitar, upright bass, steel guitar, banjo, dobro, piano, keyboards, saxophone, harmonica, fiddle, and drums. In 2020, Williams Jr. was selected to be inducted into the Country Music Hall of Fame.

Early life
Williams was born Randall Hank Williams on May 26, 1949, in Shreveport, Louisiana. His father nicknamed him Bocephus (after Grand Ole Opry comedian Rod Brasfield's ventriloquist dummy). After his father's death in 1953, he was raised by his mother, Audrey Williams.

While he was a child, a  number of contemporary musicians visited his family, who influenced and taught him various music instruments and styles.  Among these figures of influence were Merle Haggard, Johnny Cash, Fats Domino, Earl Scruggs, Lightnin' Hopkins, and Jerry Lee Lewis. Williams first stepped on the stage and sang his father's songs when he was eight years old.

He attended John Overton High School in Nashville, Tennessee, where he would bring his guitar to music class and play for pep rallies and performances of the choir.

Career 
In 1964, Williams made his recording debut with "Long Gone Lonesome Blues", one of his father's many classic songs.

He provided the singing voice of his father in the 1964 film Your Cheatin' Heart. He also recorded an album of duets with recordings of his father.

A change in appearance and musical direction
Although Williams' recordings earned him numerous country hits throughout the 1960s and early 1970s with his role as a "Hank Williams impersonator", he became disillusioned and severed ties with his mother.

By the mid-1970s Williams began to pursue a musical direction that would eventually make him a superstar. While recording a series of moderately successful songs, Williams began a heavy pattern of both drug and alcohol abuse. Upon moving to Alabama, in an attempt to refocus both his creative energy and his troubled personal life, Williams began playing music with Southern rock musicians including Waylon Jennings, Toy Caldwell, and Charlie Daniels. Hank Williams Jr. and Friends (1975), often considered his watershed album, was the product of these then-groundbreaking collaborations.

On August 8, 1975, Williams was nearly killed in a mountain-climbing accident in southwestern Montana. While climbing Ajax Peak on the continental divide (Idaho border) west of Jackson, the snow beneath him collapsed and he fell almost  onto rock; he suffered multiple skull and facial fractures. The incident was chronicled in the semi-autobiographical, made-for-television film Living Proof: The Hank Williams Jr. Story. He spent two years in recovery, having several reconstructive surgeries in addition to having to learn to talk and sing again. To hide the scars and the disfigurement from the accident, Williams grew a beard and began wearing sunglasses and a cowboy hat. The beard, hat, and sunglasses have since become his signature look, and he is rarely seen without them.
 
In 1977, Williams recorded and released One Night Stands and The New South, and worked closely with his old friend Waylon Jennings on the song "Once and For All".
 
In 1980, he appeared on the PBS show Austin City Limits during Season 5, along with the Shake Russell-Dana Cooper Band.

Acceptance into the country music establishment

In 1976, Rolling Stone wrote that Williams' "mainstream country material has always been among Nashvilles best". Williams' career began to hit its peak after the Nashville establishment gradually—and somewhat reluctantly—accepted his new sound. His popularity had risen to levels where he could no longer be overlooked for major industry awards.

He was prolific throughout the 1980s, sometimes recording and releasing two albums a year. Family Tradition, Whiskey Bent and Hell Bound, Habits Old and New, Rowdy, The Pressure Is On, High Notes, Strong Stuff, Man of Steel, Major Moves, Five-O, Montana Cafe, and many others resulted in a long string of hits.

Between 1979 and 1992, Williams released 21 albums—18 studio albums and three compilations—that were all certified at least gold by the RIAA. Between 1979 and 1990, he enjoyed a string of 30 Top Ten singles on the Billboard Country charts, including eight No. 1 singles, for a total of 44 Top Ten singles, including a total of 10 No. 1 singles, during his career.

In 1982, he had nine albums simultaneously on the Billboard Top Country Albums chart, all of which were original works and not compilations. In 1987–88, Williams was named Entertainer of the Year by the Country Music Association. In 1987, 1988, and 1989, he won the same award from the Academy of Country Music. The pinnacle album of his acceptance and popularity was Born to Boogie.

During the 1980s, Williams Jr. became a country music superstar known for catchy anthems and hard-edged, rock-influenced country. During the late 1970s and into the mid-1980s, Williams' songs constantly flew into the number one or number two spots, with songs such as "Family Tradition", "Whiskey Bent and Hell Bound", "Old Habits", "Ain't Misbehavin, "Born to Boogie", and "My Name Is Bocephus".

The hit single "Wild Streak" (1987) was co-written by Houston native Terri Sharp, for which Williams and Sharp both earned gold records.

In 1988, he released a Southern pride song, "If the South Woulda Won". The reference is to a notional Southern victory in the Civil War.

His 1989 hit "There's a Tear in My Beer" was a duet with his father created using electronic merging technology. The song was written by his father, and had been previously recorded with Hank Williams playing the guitar as the sole instrument. The music video for the song combined existing television footage of Hank Williams performing, onto which electronic merging technology impressed the recordings of Williams, which then made it appear as if he were actually playing with his father. The video was both a critical and commercial success. It was named Video of the Year by both the Country Music Association and the Academy of Country Music. Williams would go on to win a Grammy Award in 1990 for Best Country Vocal Collaboration.

He is well known for his hit "A Country Boy Can Survive" and as the performer of the theme song for Monday Night Football, based on his 1984 hit "All My Rowdy Friends Are Coming Over Tonight". In 1991, 1992, 1993, and 1994, Williams' opening themes for Monday Night Football earned him four Emmy Awards. 

In 2000, he provided the voice of Injun Joe in Tom Sawyer. In 2001, Williams Jr. co-wrote his classic hit "A Country Boy Can Survive" after 9/11, renaming it "America Can Survive". In 2004, Williams was featured prominently on CMT Outlaws. In 2006, he starred at the Summerfest concert.

He has also made a cameo appearance along with Larry the Cable Guy, Kid Rock, and Charlie Daniels in Gretchen Wilson's music video for the song "All Jacked Up". He and Kid Rock also appeared in Wilson's "Redneck Woman" video. Hank also had a small part of Kid Rock's video "Only God Knows Why", and "Redneck Paradise".

In April 2009, Williams released a new single, "Red, White & Pink-Slip Blues", which peaked at number 43 on the country charts. The song was the lead-off single to Williams' album 127 Rose Avenue. The album debuted and peaked at number 7 on the Billboard Top Country Albums chart. Also in July 2009, 127 Rose Avenue was announced as his last album for Curb Records.

Musical style   

As a multi-instrumentalist, Williams' repertoire of skills includes guitar, bass guitar, upright bass, steel guitar, banjo, dobro, piano, keyboards, saxophone, harmonica, fiddle, and drums. Williams began his recording career performing covers of his father's songs. Despite catering to the country music market, Williams preferred to listen to rhythm and blues. Williams also recorded singles under the name Luke the Drifter Jr. (a reference to his father's alias "Luke the Drifter"), rock and roll singles under the aliases Rockin' Randall and Bocephus (a nickname given to him by his father), and blues under the name Thunderhead Hawkins. Williams' style evolved slowly as he struggled to find his own voice and place within traditional country music, before challenging the country music establishment with a blend of traditional country, rock and blues.

Legacy 

Artists who have cited Hank Williams Jr. as an influence include Delta Generators, Walker Hayes, Sam Hunt, Davin James, Shooter Jennings, Wayne Mills, The Sickstring Outlaws and Gretchen Wilson.

On April 10, 2006, CMT honored Williams with the Johnny Cash Visionary Award, presenting it to him at the 2006 CMT Music Awards. On November 11, 2008, Williams was honored as a BMI Icon at the 56th annual BMI Country Awards. The artists and songwriters named BMI Icons have had "a unique and indelible influence on generations of music makers".

In 2015, Williams was inducted into the Louisiana Music Hall of Fame. On August 12, 2020, Williams was selected to be inducted into the Country Music Hall of Fame.

Personal life
His daughter Katherine Williams-Dunning, the only one of Williams's five children not to pursue a career in music, died on June 13, 2020, in a car crash at the age of 27. His son Shelton performs as Hank Williams III; his other children Holly Williams, Hilary Williams and Sam Williams are also musicians, as is his grandson Coleman Williams (Hank III's son), who performs under the sobriquet "IV."  His wife, Mary Jane died on Tuesday, March 22, 2022 Mary Jane was 58.

Politics
Williams has been politically involved with the Republican Party. For the 2000 U.S. Presidential election, he rerecorded his song "We Are Young Country" to "This is Bush–Cheney Country". On October 15, 2008, at a rally in Virginia Beach for Republican presidential nominee John McCain, he performed "McCain–Palin Tradition", a song in support of McCain and his running mate, Sarah Palin. He has contributed to federal election campaigns, mostly to Republicans, including Michele Bachmann's 2012 presidential campaign. However, he has donated to some Democrats in the past, most notably Jim Cooper and John S. Tanner.

In November 2008, Williams considered a run for the 2012 Republican nomination as a U.S. Senator from Tennessee for the seat held by GOP incumbent Bob Corker, although his publicist said regarding Williams "no announcement has been made". Williams, ultimately, did not run.

2011 Fox and Friends controversy
In an October 3, 2011, interview with Fox News Channel's Fox & Friends, Williams discussed a June golf game where President Barack Obama and Republican House Speaker John Boehner had teamed against Vice President Joe Biden and Ohio Governor John Kasich, saying the match was "one of the biggest political mistakes ever". When asked why the golf game troubled him, Williams stated, "Come on. That'd be like Hitler playing golf with Netanyahu ... in the shape this country is in?" He also said that the President and Vice President were "the enemy" and compared them to "the Three Stooges". Later, anchor Gretchen Carlson said to him, "You used the name of one of the most hated people in all of the world to describe, I think, the president." Williams replied, "Well, that is true. But I'm telling you like it is." As a result of his statements, ESPN dropped Williams' opening song from its Monday Night Football broadcast of the Tampa Bay Buccaneers versus the Indianapolis Colts and replaced it with the national anthem.

Williams later said his analogy was "extreme – but it was to make a point", and "some of us have strong opinions and are often misunderstood ... I was simply trying to explain how stupid it seemed to me – how ludicrous that pairing was. They're polar opposites, and it made no sense. They don't see eye to eye and never will". Additionally, Williams said he has "always respected the office of the president ... Working-class people are hurting – and it doesn't seem like anybody cares. When both sides are high-fiving it on the ninth hole when everybody else is without a job – it makes a whole lot of us angry. Something has to change. The policies have to change". ESPN later said it was "extremely disappointed" in Williams' comments, and pulled his opening from that night's broadcast.

Three days later, ESPN announced Williams and his song would not return to Monday Night Football, ending the use of the song that had been part of the broadcast on both ABC and ESPN since 1989. Williams expressed defiance and indifference on his website, and said he was the one who had made the decision. "After reading hundreds of e-mails, I have made MY decision," he wrote. "By pulling my opening Oct 3rd, You (ESPN) stepped on the Toes of The First Amendment Freedom of Speech, so therefore Me, My Song, and All My Rowdy Friends are OUT OF HERE. It's been a great run." Williams' son, Hank Williams III, stayed neutral in the debate, telling TMZ.com that most musicians, including his father, are "not worthy" of a political discussion.

After his song was pulled from Monday Night Football, Williams recorded a song criticizing Obama, ESPN and Fox & Friends, titled "Keep the Change". He released the track on iTunes and via free download at his website. The song garnered over 180,000 downloads in two days.

Williams continued to make his opinions of President Obama known and during a performance at the Iowa State Fair in August 2012, he called Obama a Muslim telling the crowd, "We've got a Muslim president who hates farming, hates the military, hates the U.S. and we hate him!"

Discography

Your Cheatin' Heart (1964)
Connie Francis and Hank Williams Jr. Sing Great Country Favorites (1964)
Ballads of the Hills and Plains (1965)
Blues My Name (1965)
Country Shadows (1966)
A Time to Sing (1967)
My Own Way (1967)
My Songs (1967)
Luke The Drifter Jr. (1968)
Songs My Father Left Me (1969)
Luke the Drifter Jr. Vol. 2 (1969)
Live at Cobo Hall (1969)
Sunday Morning (1969)
Removing The Shadow (1970)
Luke The Drifter Jr. Vol. 3 (1970)
Singing My Songs: Johnny Cash (1970)
I've Got A Right To Cry (1971)
Sweet Dreams (1971)
All For The Love of Sunshine (1971)
Whole Lotta Loving (1972)
Eleven Roses (1972)
After You, Pride's Not Hard to Swallow (1973)
Living Proof (1974)
The Last Love Song (1974)
Bocephus (1975)
One Night Stands (1977)
Hank Williams Jr. and Friends (1975)
The New South (1977)
Family Tradition (1979)
Whiskey Bent and Hell Bound (1979)
Habits Old and New (1980)
Rowdy (1981)
The Pressure Is On (1981)
High Notes (1982)
Strong Stuff (1983)
Man of Steel (1983)
Major Moves (1984)
Five-O (1985)
Montana Cafe (1986)
Hank Live (1987)
Born to Boogie (1987)
Wild Streak (1988)
Lone Wolf (1990)
Pure Hank (1991)
Maverick (1992)
Out of Left Field (1993)
Hog Wild (1995)
A.K.A. Wham Bam Sam (1996)
Three Hanks: Men with Broken Hearts (1996)
Stormy (1999)
The Almeria Club Recordings (2002)
I'm One of You (2003)
127 Rose Avenue (2009)
Old School New Rules (2012)
 It's About Time (2016)
 Rich White Honky Blues (2022)

Awards and nominations

References

External links

 
	
 
 
  (primarily under 'Williams, Hank, 1949–' without 'Jr.')

1949 births
American blues guitarists
American blues singers
American country singer-songwriters
American country guitarists
American country rock musicians
American country rock singers
American rock double-bassists
American rock guitarists
American male singer-songwriters
American Southern Rock musicians
Blues rock musicians
Country Music Hall of Fame inductees
Country musicians from Louisiana
Curb Records artists
Emmy Award winners
Grammy Award winners
Living people
Musicians from Shreveport, Louisiana
Hank Williams
People from Henry County, Tennessee
Rock and roll musicians
Singer-songwriters from Louisiana
Tennessee Republicans